Red River usually refers to one of the following:
 Red River (Asia) (Chinese: 紅河, 红河, Hóng Hé; Vietnamese: Sông Hồng) in China and Vietnam
 Red River of the North in Canada and the United States
 Red River of the South, a tributary of the Mississippi in Texas, Oklahoma, Arkansas, and Louisiana in the United States

Red River may also refer to:

Rivers

United States
 Red River (Cumberland River), a tributary of the Cumberland in Kentucky and Tennessee
 Red River (Illinois), a tributary of Panther Creek in Woodford County
 Red River (Kentucky River), a tributary of the Kentucky
 Red River (Maine), a tributary of the Fish
 Red River (New Mexico), a tributary of the Rio Grande
 Red River, New York, a tributary of the Moose
 Red River (Oregon), in the United States
 Red River (St. Louis River tributary), in Minnesota and Wisconsin
 Red River (Wolf River tributary), in Wisconsin
 Red River of the North, flows northward between Minnesota and North Dakota
 Red River of the South, border river between Texas and Oklahoma

Elsewhere
 Red River (Victoria), in Australia
 Red River (British Columbia), a tributary of the Kechika in Canada
 Red River Floodway, a diversion of the Red River of the North around Winnipeg in Canada
 Red River (Grenada)
 Red River (New Zealand), a minor river on the North Island
 Red River (Amal) (Cornish: Dowr Amal), in the United Kingdom, discharging into Cornwall's south coast
 Red River (Koner) (Cornish: Dowr Koner), in the United Kingdom, discharging into Cornwall's north coast
Red River (Asia), a river in China and Vietnam
 Baloué River, in Mali (Manding: "Red River")
 Kızılırmak River or Halys River, in Turkey (Turkish: "Red River")
 Sutlej, in Pakistan sometimes known as the Red River

Settlements
 Red River, a settlement in Inverness County, Nova Scotia, Canada
 Red River, New Mexico, a ski resort in the United States
 Red River, South Carolina, an unincorporated community in York County
 Red River, Tennessee, original name of the city now known as Adams
 Red River City, Texas, former town of 1870s, now part of Denison, Texas
 Red River, Wisconsin, a town in Kewaunee County, WI, United States
 Red River, Shawano County, Wisconsin, an unincorporated community in the United States
 Red River Army Depot, in Texas, United States
 Red River Colony, in Manitoba, Canada
 Red River, Queensland, a rural locality in Australia

Areas
 Red River County, Texas, in the United States
 Red River Delta, an administrative region of Vietnam
 Red River Parish, Louisiana, in the United States
 Red River Valley, a remnant of glacial Lake Agassiz in Canada

Mythology
The Red River in Chinese mythology, one of the four cardinal rivers which flows out of (the mythological) Kunlun Mountain range

Other uses
 Red River (1948 film), an American film named for the Texan river
 Red River (1988 film), a television movie remake of the classic film from 1948, starring Gregory Harrison
 Red River (2009 film), a Chinese film named for the Yunnanese river
 Red River (2022 film), an upcoming Indian Malayalam-language film
 Red River (manga), a 1995 Japanese graphic novel series named for the Turkish river
 Red River, a fictional river in City of Heroes
 "Red River", a 2011 song by The Launderettes
 Red River Cereal, a flax-based hot breakfast cereal
 Red River College, a college in Winnipeg, Manitoba, Canada
 Red River Drifter, 2013 album by Michael Martin Murphey
 Red River Trails, historical trails of the Red River of the North
 "Red River Valley", an American folk song set along one of the American Red Rivers

See also
 Colorado River (disambiguation), for rivers bearing the Spanish word for "Red"
 Ipiranga (disambiguation) (sometimes Ypiranga), for places bearing the Tupian word for "Red River"
 Ipiranga River (disambiguation), for rivers bearing the Tupian word for "Red River"
 Little Red River (disambiguation)
 Red River cart, a two-wheeled cart used historically in the area of the Red River of the North
 Red River Campaign, a series of battles fought in the American Civil War in 1864
 Red River Exhibition, annual festival in Canada
 Red River Expedition (disambiguation), various expeditions of that name
 Red River floods, various floods of the Red River of the North
 Red river hog, an African species of wild pig, reddish in color
 Red River Rebellion, the Métis rebellion led by Louis Riel in present-day Manitoba, Canada
 Red River Showdown, an annual football game between the University of Oklahoma and the University of Texas
 Rouge River (disambiguation), for rivers bearing the French word for "Red"
 Red River Valley (disambiguation)